A Mother's Atonement is a 1915 American silent drama film directed by Joe De Grasse, written by Ida May Park, and featuring Lon Chaney and Cleo Madison. Chaney played a dual role as Ben Morrison (both as an old man and his younger self). Two stills exist showing Lon Chaney in both of the roles he plays in the film.

A partially complete copy (reels one and two of three) are stored in the Library of Congress and are currently circulating on dvd. Roughly the last ten minutes of the film are lost however.

Plot
Ben Morrison (Lon Chaney) and his daughter Jen (Cleo Madison) live on an island not far from the mainland. Jasper Crane, a crude middle-aged man, wants to marry Jen, and bargains with Ben to buy her. Ben relates the story of how his wife Alice deserted him many years ago, leaving him for a city slicker, John Newton. (In the flashback sequence, Chaney plays his younger self.)

Jen overhears her father bargaining to sell her to Mr. Crane, and she is horrified. Unwilling to marry him, Jen escapes through a trap door in the cottage's floor and swims across a wide expanse of water to the mainland where she is pulled out of the water by two business partners James Hilton and Wilbur Kent. Kent is engaged to marry James Hilton's sister, Dorothy. James takes an interest in Jen, but his mother Mrs. Hilton decides that Jen must go. Kent gives Jen some money for expenses and tells her to come see him if she ever needs anything.

Over the years, John Newton eventually tired of Alice, and she drifted in with a vulgar social set. Kent decides he needs a final bachelor's spree before his marriage to Dorothy and plans a raucous party on his yacht. John Newton is to be at the party, and Kent plans to surprise him by inviting Alice. Jen is unable to find work in the city and writes Kent for help. Her letter arrives at the height of the party, and Kent plans to add to the fun by bringing the girl to the party as well.

When she arrives, Alice recognizes Jen as her daughter, but does not tell anyone. Meanwhile, a financial problem arises and Hilton hurries to the party to discuss the situation with Kent. When he arrives, Hilton sees Alice, obviously very uncomfortable in the riotous surroundings. Newton, seeing how Alice is suffering, asks for her forgiveness, and begs her to lead a life worthy of her daughter. Hilton and Jen declare their love for each other, while Newton comforts Alice who is distraught with emotion.

Cast
 Cleo Madison in a dual role as both Alice Morrison and Jen Morrison
 Lon Chaney in a dual role as Ben Morrison (both his older and younger selves)
 Arthur Shirley as James Hilton
 Wyndham Standing as Wilbur Kent
 Millard K. Wilson as John Newton
 Ben Rothwell as Jasper Crane
 Mildred Manning as Dorothy Hilton

Reception
"This is not a picture for the unsophisticated as it makes no pretense of hiding its true colors. The first scenes, photographed in the environs of a lake, are ideal, being well chosen and excellently filmed." --- Motion Picture News

References

External links

1915 films
Silent American drama films
1915 short films
American silent short films
American black-and-white films
1915 drama films
Films directed by Joseph De Grasse
Universal Pictures short films
1910s American films